Netaji Subhas University of Technology (NSUT), formerly Netaji Subhas Institute of Technology (NSIT) is a state university located in Dwarka, Delhi, India. In 2018, the institute was granted University status, changing its name to Netaji Subhas University of Technology (NSUT).

Campus

NSUT has a fully residential campus on 145 acres of land. Campus facilities include faculty and staff residences, student hostels, cooperative mess and a sports complex. The campus is divided into clusters of buildings. The administrative block contains important offices, banks, a post office, and an auditorium where major functions are held. The campus has four boys' hostels (one for each year) and two girls' hostels.

East campus 

The East campus is located in Geeta Colony.

West campus 

The West campus is located in Jaffarpur Kalan.

Rankings

The Netaji Subhas University of Technology was ranked 79 among engineering institutes by the National Institutional Ranking Framework (NIRF) in 2022.

Notable alumni
Naveen Kasturia, film actor and assistant director
Prashasti Singh, stand-up comic, writer
Ishan Gupta, Founder and CEO at EduKart
Prayag Narula, Founder and chairman at LeadGenius
Paavan Nanda, Founder at Zostel, ZO Rooms and WinZO
Ira Singhal - IAS Officer
Kenson Casimir, a Saint Lucian politician, former sports broadcaster and journalist.

References

External links
 

Engineering colleges in Delhi
Memorials to Subhas Chandra Bose
Educational institutions established in 1983
1983 establishments in Delhi